was a Japanese singer.  She was a virtuoso performer of the popular songs of that period – imayō (今様) – and was the foremost authority on the form, which had been passed down through generations of female teachers.  In her seventies, she passed on her knowledge to the seventy-seventh emperor, Go-Shirakawa, who collected the works in the popular anthology, Songs to Make the Dust Dance on the Beams (Ryōjin Hishō 梁塵秘抄).

References

1085 births
1169 deaths
Japanese women singers
12th-century women musicians
12th-century Japanese people